The Twenty-sixth Amendment (Amendment XXVI) to the United States Constitution prohibits the states and the federal government from using age as a reason for denying the right to vote to citizens of the United States who are at least eighteen years old. It was proposed by Congress on March 23, 1971, and three-fourths of the states ratified it by July 1, 1971.

Various public officials had supported lowering the voting age during the mid-20th century, but were unable to gain the legislative momentum necessary for passing a constitutional amendment.

The drive to lower the voting age from 21 to 18 grew across the country during the 1960s, was driven in part by the military draft held during the Vietnam War. The draft conscripted young men between the ages of 18 and 21 into the United States Armed Forces, primarily the U.S. Army, to serve in or support military combat operations in Vietnam. A common slogan of proponents of lowering the voting age was "old enough to fight, old enough to vote".

Determined to get around inaction on the issue, congressional allies included a provision for the 18-year-old vote in a 1970 bill that extended the Voting Rights Act. The Supreme Court subsequently held in the case of Oregon v. Mitchell that Congress could not lower the voting age for state and local elections. Recognizing the confusion and costs that would be involved in maintaining separate voting rolls and elections for federal and state contests, Congress quickly proposed and the states ratified the Twenty-sixth Amendment.

Text

Background

Senator Harley Kilgore began advocating for a lowered voting age in 1941 in the 77th Congress. Despite the support of fellow senators, representatives, and First Lady Eleanor Roosevelt, Congress failed to pass any national change. However, public interest in lowering the voting age became a topic of interest at the local level. In 1943 and 1955 respectively, the Georgia and Kentucky legislatures approved measures to lower the voting age to 18.

President Dwight D. Eisenhower, in his 1954 State of the Union address, became the first president to publicly support prohibiting age-based denials of suffrage for those 18 and older. During the 1960s, both Congress and the state legislatures came under increasing pressure to lower the minimum voting age from 21 to 18. This was in large part due to the Vietnam War, in which many young men who were ineligible to vote were conscripted to fight in the war, thus lacking any means to influence the people sending them off to risk their lives. "Old enough to fight, old enough to vote" was a common slogan used by proponents of lowering the voting age. The slogan traced its roots to World War II, when President Franklin D. Roosevelt lowered the military draft age to 18.

In 1963, the President's Commission on Registration and Voting Participation, in its report to President Johnson, encouraged lowering the voting age. Johnson proposed an immediate national grant of the right to vote to 18-year-olds on May 29, 1968. Historian Thomas H. Neale argues that the move to lower the voting age followed a historical pattern similar to other extensions of the franchise; with the escalation of the war in Vietnam, constituents were mobilized and eventually a constitutional amendment passed.

Those advocating for a lower voting age drew on a range of arguments to promote their cause, and scholarship increasingly links the rise of support for a lower voting age to young people's role in the civil rights movement and other movements for social and political change of the 1950s and 1960s. Increasing high-school graduation rates and young people's access to political information through new technologies also influenced more positive views of their preparation for the most important right of citizenship.

Between 1942, when public debates about a lower voting age began in earnest, and the early 1970s, ideas about youth agency increasingly challenged the caretaking model that had previously dominated the nation's approaches to young people's rights. Characteristics traditionally associated with youth—idealism, lack of "vested interests," and openness to new ideas—came to be seen as positive qualities for a political system that seemed to be in crisis.

In 1970, Senator Ted Kennedy proposed amending the Voting Rights Act of 1965 to lower the voting age nationally. On June 22, 1970, President Richard Nixon signed an extension of the Voting Rights Act of 1965 that required the voting age to be 18 in all federal, state, and local elections. In his statement on signing the extension, Nixon said:

Subsequently, Oregon and Texas challenged the law in court, and the case came before the Supreme Court in 1970 as Oregon v. Mitchell. By this time, four states had a minimum voting age below 21: Georgia, Kentucky, Alaska and Hawaii.

Oregon v. Mitchell

During debate of the 1970 extension of the Voting Rights Act, Senator Ted Kennedy argued that the Equal Protection Clause of the Fourteenth Amendment allowed Congress to pass national legislation lowering the voting age. In Katzenbach v. Morgan (1966), the Supreme Court had ruled that if Congress acts to enforce the 14th Amendment by passing a law declaring that a type of state law discriminates against a certain class of persons, the Supreme Court will let the law stand if the justices can "perceive a basis" for Congress's actions.

President Nixon disagreed with Kennedy in a letter to the Speaker of the House and the House minority and majority leaders, asserting that the issue is not whether the voting age should be lowered, but how. In his own interpretation of Katzenbach, Nixon argued that to include age as something discriminatory would be too big of a stretch and voiced concerns that the damage of a Supreme Court decision to overturn the Voting Rights Act could be disastrous.

In Oregon v. Mitchell (1970), the Supreme Court considered whether the voting-age provisions Congress added to the Voting Rights Act in 1970 were constitutional. The Court struck down the provisions that established 18 as the voting age in state and local elections. However, the Court upheld the provision establishing the voting age as 18 in federal elections. The Court was deeply divided in this case, and a majority of justices did not agree on a rationale for the holding.

The decision resulted in states being able to maintain 21 as the voting age in state and local elections, but being required to establish separate voter rolls so that voters between 18 and 21 years old could vote in federal elections.

Opposition
Although the Twenty-sixth Amendment passed faster than any other constitutional amendment, about 17 states refused to pass measures to lower their minimum voting ages after Nixon signed the 1970 extension to the Voting Rights Act. Opponents to extending the vote to youths questioned the maturity and responsibility of people at the age of 18. Representative Emanuel Celler, one of the most vocal opponents of a lower voting age from the 1940s through 1970 (and Chair of the powerful House Judiciary Committee for much of that period), insisted that youth lacked "the good judgment" essential to good citizenship and that the qualities that made youth good soldiers did not also make them good voters. Professor William G. Carleton wondered why the vote was proposed for youth at a time when the period of adolescence had grown so substantially rather than in the past when people had more responsibilities at earlier ages. Carleton further criticized the move to lower the voting age citing American preoccupations with youth in general, exaggerated reliance on higher education, and equating technological savvy with responsibility and intelligence. He denounced the military service argument as well, calling it a "cliche". Considering the ages of soldiers in the Civil War, he asserted that literacy and education were not the grounds for limiting voting; rather, common sense and the capacity to understand the political system grounded voting age restrictions.

James J. Kilpatrick, a political columnist, asserted that the states were "extorted" into ratifying the Twenty-sixth Amendment. In his article, he claims that by passing the 1970 extension to the Voting Rights Act, Congress effectively forced the States to ratify the amendment lest they be forced to financially and bureaucratically cope with maintaining two voting registers. George Gallup also mentions the cost of registration in his article showing percentages favoring or opposing the amendment, and he draws particular attention to the lower rates of support among adults aged 30–49 and over 50 (57% and 52% respectively) as opposed to those aged 18–20 and 21–29 (84% and 73% respectively).

Proposal and ratification

Passage by Congress

Senator Birch Bayh's subcommittee on constitutional amendments began hearings on extending voting rights to 18 year-olds in 1968.

After Oregon v. Mitchell, Bayh surveyed election officials in 47 states and found that registering an estimated 10million young people in a separate system for federal elections would cost approximately $20million. Bayh concluded that most states could not change their state constitutions in time for the 1972 election, mandating national action to avoid "chaos and confusion" at the polls.

On March 2, 1971, Bayh's subcommittee and the House Judiciary Committee approved the proposed constitutional amendment to lower the voting age to 18 for all elections.

On March 10, 1971, the Senate voted 94–0 in favor of proposing a constitutional amendment to guarantee the minimum voting age could not be higher than 18. On March 23, 1971, the House of Representatives voted 401–19 in favor of the proposed amendment.

Ratification by the states

Having been passed by the 92nd United States Congress, the proposed Twenty-sixth Amendment was sent to the state legislatures for their consideration. Ratification was completed on July 1, 1971, after the amendment had been ratified by the following thirty-eight states:

 Connecticut: March 23, 1971
 Delaware: March 23, 1971
 Minnesota: March 23, 1971
 Tennessee: March 23, 1971
 Washington: March 23, 1971
 Hawaii: March 24, 1971
 Massachusetts: March 24, 1971
 Montana: March 29, 1971
 Arkansas: March 30, 1971
 Idaho: March 30, 1971
 Iowa: March 30, 1971
 Nebraska: April 2, 1971
 New Jersey: April 3, 1971
 Kansas: April 7, 1971
 Michigan: April 7, 1971
 Alaska: April 8, 1971
 Maryland: April 8, 1971
 Indiana: April 8, 1971
 Maine: April 9, 1971
 Vermont: April 16, 1971
 Louisiana: April 17, 1971
 California: April 19, 1971
 Colorado: April 27, 1971
 Pennsylvania: April 27, 1971
 Texas: April 27, 1971
 South Carolina: April 28, 1971
 West Virginia: April 28, 1971
 New Hampshire: May 13, 1971
 Arizona: May 14, 1971
 Rhode Island: May 27, 1971
 New York: June 2, 1971
 Oregon: June 4, 1971
 Missouri: June 14, 1971
 Wisconsin: June 22, 1971
 Illinois: June 29, 1971
 Alabama: June 30, 1971
 Ohio: June 30, 1971
 North Carolina: July 1, 1971

Having been ratified by three-fourths of the States (38), the Twenty-sixth Amendment became part of the Constitution. On July 5, 1971, the Administrator of General Services, Robert Kunzig, certified its adoption. President Nixon and Julianne Jones, Joseph W. Loyd Jr., and Paul S. Larimer of the "Young Americans in Concert" also signed the certificate as witnesses. During the signing ceremony, held in the East Room of the White House, Nixon talked about his confidence in the youth of America:

The amendment was subsequently ratified by the following states, bringing the total number of ratifying states to forty-three:

 39. Oklahoma: July 1, 1971
 40. Virginia: July 8, 1971
 41. Wyoming: July 8, 1971
 42. Georgia: October 4, 1971
 43. South Dakota: March 4, 2014

No action has been taken on the amendment by the states of Florida, Kentucky, Mississippi, Nevada, New Mexico, North Dakota, or Utah.

See also

 Fifteenth Amendment to the United States Constitution (1870, extending vote to non-white men)
 Nineteenth Amendment to the United States Constitution (1920, women's right to vote)
 Representation of the People Act 1969 (legislation in the United Kingdom with equivalent effect)

References

Further reading
 Caplan, Sheri J. Old Enough: How 18-Year-Olds Won the Vote & Why it Matters. Heath Hen, 2020. .

External links
 CRS Annotated Constitution: Twenty-sixth Amendment
 Eric Fish, The Twenty-sixth Amendment Enforcement Power

1971 in American law
1971 in American politics
26
History of voting rights in the United States
History of youth